Redoubt Volcano, or Mount Redoubt (Dena'ina: Bentuggezh K’enulgheli), is an active stratovolcano in the largely volcanic Aleutian Range of the U.S. state of Alaska. At , in just over  Mount Redoubt attains  of prominence over its surrounding terrain. It is the highest summit in the Aleutian Range. In 1976, Redoubt Volcano was designated as a National Natural Landmark by the National Park Service.

Active for millennia, Mount Redoubt has erupted four times since it was first observed: in 1902, 1966, 1989 and 2009, with two questionable eruptions in 1881 and 1933. It caught KLM Flight 867, a Boeing 747 aircraft, in its plume. After the plane descended 13,000 feet, the pilots restarted the engines and landed the plane safely at Anchorage. The 1989 eruption is also notable for being the first ever volcanic eruption to be successfully predicted by the method of long-period seismic events developed by Swiss/American volcanologist Bernard Chouet. As of August 2015, the Alaska Volcano Observatory has rated Redoubt as Aviation Alert Level Green and Volcano Alert Level Normal.

Name
The official name of the mountain is Redoubt Volcano, a translation of the Russian name "Sopka Redutskaya", referring to, as does the word "redoubt", "a fortified place". A local name, "Ujakushatsch", also means "fortified place", but it is difficult to determine if one name is derived from the other. The Board on Geographic Names decided on the name "Redoubt Volcano" in 1891.

The Global Volcanism Program of the Smithsonian Institution refers to the mountain simply as "Redoubt", and lists these alternate names: Burnt Mountain, Goreloi, Mirando, Ujakushatsch, Viesokaia, and Yjakushatsch. The Alaska Volcano Observatory also uses simply "Redoubt"; it lists the same alternate names in addition to: Goryalaya, Redoute Mtn., and Redutskaya, Sopka.

Geology

The sides of the upper cone are relatively steep (in comparison to volcanoes in general). Made up of pyroclastic flow deposits and lava flows, and resting on Mesozoic era rocks of the Aleutian Mountain Range batholith, the mountain has been somewhat weathered by movement of several glaciers that reside on it. The current main vent is on the north side of the crater by the head of the Drift glacier. Also present on the mountain are Holocene lahar deposits that extend as far as the Cook Inlet. This mountain has produced andesite, basalt and dacite, with relatively silicic andesite dominant in recent eruptions.

Eruptions

Early reports
Captain James Cook saw Mt. Redoubt during the summer of 1778, describing it as "emitting a white smoke but no fire which made some think it was no more than a white thick cloud such as we have frequently seen on the Coast, for the most part appearing on the sides of hills and often extends along a whole range and at different times falls or rises, expands or contracts itself and has a resemblance to Clouds of white smoke. But this besides being too small for one of those clouds, remained as it were fixed in the same spot for the whole time the Mountain was clear which was above 48 hours." However, several sources call this a "discredited eruption". There are several other of these activities that are not called eruptions.

In 1819, smoke was observed at the mountain. However, this is often not recorded as an eruption as the information was insufficient to identify it as such. Similarly, in 2003, a blowing cloud of snow was mistaken by an employee of the ConocoPhillips Building in Anchorage for an ash plume. Possible steam-vapor let off was observed in 1933 at the mountain.

1881
Fire has been seen issuing from its summit far out at sea. A great eruption took place in 1881, when a party of native hunters half-way up its slopes were overwhelmed by a lava-flow and only two escaped." However, this eruption is not well documented by other sources.

1902
The volcano erupted rather abruptly in 1902, spewing out ash from January 18 to June 21 in the year. A local newspaper stated, "Word has just been received that Redoubt, one of the volcanoes at Cook's Inlet had an eruption on January 18, and the country for  around was covered with ashes and lava. The news comes from Sunrise, but nothing definite has been ascertained as to whether any damage was done, for no boats have as yet been in the neighborhood of the volcano." There were many other news reports on the eruption, one describing the eruption as "a terrific earthquake which burst the mountain asunder leaving a large gap," which could possibly suggest the crack formation in the volcano's crater, however, it is unlikely. Supposedly, the volcano was ejecting "flames" from its crater, and the eruption terrified natives in the area.

1989–1990
The volcano erupted on December 14, 1989, and continued to erupt for over six months. Sudden melting of snow and ice at the summit caused by pyroclastic flows and dome collapses caused lahars, or mudflows, which flowed down the north flank of the mountain. The lahars entered a nearby river, worrying officials that they might destroy an oil storage facility located along it.

Since lahars were produced repeatedly, scientists realized that they could use these to analyze a trial period for a newly developed device proposed to measure the movement of rocks against each other. This device, now known as an Acoustic Flow Monitor, alerts nearby stations to possible lahars.

The eruption also caused an airliner to have all four engines fail after a Boeing 747-400 jumbo jet operated by KLM Royal Dutch Airlines flew into a cloud of volcanic ash.
Damage from the eruption was estimated at $160 million, the second costliest volcanic eruption in United States history.

2009

Pre-eruption 
On January 24, 2009, a magnitude 5.8 earthquake hit the region at a depth of 98 kilometers. The relation to the eruption is unknown, but was the strongest in the vicinity since 2001.

On January 30, 2009, scientists from the Alaska Volcano Observatory (AVO) warned that an eruption was imminent, sending experienced Alaskans shopping for protection against a dusty shower of volcanic ash that could descend on south-central Alaska.

By January 31, volcanic earthquakes increased to several per hour, and a large hole in the glacier on the side of the mountain was spotted. Scientists began to monitor seismic data from the mountain twenty-four hours a day in an effort to warn people in nearby communities.  A fly over conducted by the AVO detected "significant steaming from a new melt depression at the mouth of the summit crater near the vent area of the 1989-90 eruption."

March 15
Seismic activity at Redoubt increased beginning about 13:01 ATZ. Later reports were that the plume was then mainly steam.

On the basis of this change in activity, AVO increased the level of concern and alert level to ORANGE/WATCH.

Emissions 
The material ejected from the volcano mainly consisted of water vapor, along with smaller amounts of carbon dioxide and sulfur dioxide. Further study by airborne monitors suggests that the materials were not oxidized much, and little of the concentration contained sulfates, less than 20%.

Large scale eruptions begin

Mount Redoubt erupted explosively late in the evening of March 22, 2009. AVO has recorded numerous volcanic eruptions and/or explosions at Redoubt volcano.

See also

List of mountain peaks of North America
List of mountain peaks of the United States
List of mountain peaks of Alaska
List of Ultras of the United States
List of volcanoes in the United States

References

External links and resources

 Alaska Volcano Observatory (to follow 2009 volcanic activity by geologists reports)
 Live updates from the AVO Twitter page
 Webcams:
 Redoubt Volcano Webcam, USGS (intermittently available).
 Redoubt-CI webcam, Chevron via Alaska Volcano Observatory.
 Daily Time-lapse animation of the Mount Redoubt Hut Web Cam
 Mount Redoubt Seismic Webicorders (near-real time seismic record from station near peak)
 Satellite imagery of the 23, 24, and 26 March 2009 eruptions (CIMSS Satellite Blog)
 Time lapse video and photos of the March 27, 2009, eruption, taken from Ninilchik 
 BBC page with footage and links to other pages on the volcano
 Large-format photo essay of the Mount Redoubt eruption from "The Big Picture" blog on Boston.com.

Volcanoes of Kenai Peninsula Borough, Alaska
Mountains of Kenai Peninsula Borough, Alaska
Stratovolcanoes of the United States
Active volcanoes
Volcanoes of Alaska
Mountains of Alaska
Highest points of United States national parks
Lake Clark National Park and Preserve
Aleutian Range
20th-century volcanic events
North American 3000 m summits
National Natural Landmarks in Alaska
VEI-3 volcanoes
Pleistocene stratovolcanoes
Holocene stratovolcanoes